Petr Kalus (born 29 June 1987) is a Czech retired ice hockey player. He played for many teams during his career, which lasted from 2004 to 2018, including 11 games with the Boston Bruins and Minnesota Wild of the National Hockey League between 2006 and 2010. Internationally Kalus played for the Czech national junior team at the junior level.

Playing career
Kalus played three years of junior hockey with HC Vítkovice in the Czech Republic before coming to play for the Regina Pats. Kalus was drafted in the second  round, 39th overall, in the 2005 NHL Entry Draft by the Boston Bruins. In his first season playing North American hockey, Kalus led the Pats in scoring with 58 points in 60 games. He then signed a three-year entry level contract with the Bruins on 8 May 2006.

In the 2006–07 season, Kalus played 43 games for the Providence Bruins of the American Hockey League (AHL) with 30 points. He also played nine games for the Boston Bruins with five points. In Kalus' Bruins games, he scored on his first three shots, a feat previously not done in the NHL since 1996.

On 30 June 2007, Kalus was traded by the Bruins, along with a fourth-round pick to the Minnesota Wild for goaltender Manny Fernandez. He was assigned to the Houston Aeros of the AHL. At the start of the 2008–09 season on 18 October 2008, Kalus left the Houston Aeros to play for HC MVD of the KHL, with the Wild retaining Kalus' rights through 30 June 2010.

Following a disappointing season with MVD Kalus decided on 26 June 2009 to return to the Wild for the 2009–10 season. During the 2010-11 season, Kalus' tenure with the Wild ended when he was traded to the Columbus Blue Jackets for future considerations on 1 March 2011. He was immediately assigned to AHL affiliate, the Springfield Falcons.

On 27 April 2011, Kalus signed a try-out contract with Jokerit of the SM-liiga. He was selected to return to his native Czech Republic with HC Slavia Praha before joining team MODO of the Swedish Elite Serien. He went on to have stints for a number of European teams, like Italian club HC Fassa, and Djurgarden IF.

In October 2016, Kalus rejoined British club Nottingham Panthers. It proved to be a short second stint with the Panthers as, in November 2016, Kalus was released in order to make way for Kristián Kudroč.

Career statistics

Regular season and playoffs

International

References

External links

1987 births
Living people
Boston Bruins draft picks
Boston Bruins players
Czech expatriate ice hockey players in Canada
Czech expatriate ice hockey players in Russia
Czech expatriate ice hockey players in the United States
Czech ice hockey right wingers
Djurgårdens IF Hockey players
HC MVD players
HC Slavia Praha players
HC Vítkovice players
Houston Aeros (1994–2013) players
Minnesota Wild players
Modo Hockey players
Nottingham Panthers players
Providence Bruins players
Regina Pats players
Sportspeople from Ostrava
Springfield Falcons players
Czech expatriate ice hockey players in Sweden
Czech expatriate sportspeople in England
Czech expatriate sportspeople in France
Czech expatriate sportspeople in Poland
Expatriate ice hockey players in England
Expatriate ice hockey players in France
Expatriate ice hockey players in Poland
Czech expatriate sportspeople in Italy
Expatriate ice hockey players in Italy